Analytical Biochemistry is a peer-reviewed scientific journal established in 1960. It covers the field of biochemistry. According to the Journal Citation Reports, the journal has a 2014 impact factor of 2.219.

Abstracting and Indexing 
The journal is abstracted and indexed in Analytical Abstracts, Biological Abstracts, Chemical Abstracts, Current Contents/Life Sciences, EMBASE, EMBiology, MEDLINE, Science Citation Index, and Scopus.

References

External links 
 

Publications established in 1960
Biochemistry journals
Elsevier academic journals
English-language journals
Biweekly journals